Feddison Flanders (born 19 January 1994) is an Aruban male  BMX rider, representing his nation at international competitions. He competed in the time trial event at the 2015 UCI BMX World Championships.

References

External links
 
 

1994 births
Living people
BMX riders
Aruban male cyclists
Pan American Games competitors for Aruba
Cyclists at the 2019 Pan American Games
Place of birth missing (living people)